Megan Leavey (also known as Rex) is a 2017 American biographical drama film directed by Gabriela Cowperthwaite and written by Pamela Gray, Annie Mumolo, and Tim Lovestedt, based on the true events about a young female Marine named Megan Leavey and a combat dog named Rex. The film stars Kate Mara as the titular character, with Edie Falco, Common, Ramón Rodríguez, and Tom Felton in supporting roles.

The film was released on June 9, 2017, by Bleecker Street, received positive reviews and grossed $14 million.

Plot 
Megan Leavey is a US Marine corporal who served as a Military Police K9 handler. She was paired with military working dog Rex (E168). The pair served two deployments in Iraq together. They were first deployed to Fallujah in 2005, and then to Ramadi in 2006, where they were both wounded by an improvised explosive device. Leavey was awarded the Purple Heart and the Navy and Marine Corps Achievement Medal with a "V" device denoting heroism in combat.

In 2012, Rex developed facial palsy, which ended his bomb-sniffing duties. Leavey was able to adopt him through the intervention of Senator Chuck Schumer, around April 2012. Rex died on December 22, 2012.

Cast 

The real Megan Leavey is credited in the role of Female Drill Instructor #3, while Rex is portrayed by Varco, in an uncredited role.

Production 
On August 7, 2015, it was announced that Gabriela Cowperthwaite would be directing a film about Megan Leavey, to be portrayed by actress Kate Mara, and her military combat dog Rex. The script was written by Pamela Gray, with the help of Annie Mumolo, Tim Lovestedt, and Jordan Roberts. LD Entertainment would produce the film.

Principal photography on the film began on October 12, 2015 in Charleston, South Carolina, including scenes filmed at The Citadel, with other scenes filmed in Georgia and New York City, with extensive desert and combat scenes shot in Spain.

Release
In January 2017, Bleecker Street acquired distribution rights to the film and set it for release on June 9, 2017.

The film was released on DVD and Blu-ray on September 5, 2017, from Universal Studios Home Entertainment. In the UK and Australia the film was released on DVD as Rex.

Reception

Box office
Megan Leavey was released alongside It Comes at Night and The Mummy and was expected to gross around $3 million from 1,956 theaters in its opening weekend. It ended up grossing $3.8 million, finishing 8th at the box office.

Critical response
On Rotten Tomatoes, the film has an approval rating of 85% based on 103 reviews, with an average rating of 6.8/10. The site's critical consensus reads, "Megan Leavey honors its real-life subjects with a sensitive, uplifting drama whose honest emotion more than makes up for its mild approach to the story." On Metacritic, which assigns a normalized rating, the film has average score 66 out of 100, based on 25 critics, indicating "generally favorable reviews". Audiences polled by CinemaScore gave the film an average grade of "A" on an A+ to F scale.

Awards
Megan Leavey was among the 2017 films which were honored with the Truly Moving Picture Award at the Heartland Film Festival.

References

External links 
 

2017 films
American biographical drama films
2017 biographical drama films
Films shot in South Carolina
Biographical films about military personnel
Drama films based on actual events
Films about the United States Marine Corps
War films based on actual events
Iraq War films
American war drama films
2017 war drama films
Bleecker Street films
LD Entertainment films
Films about war dogs
Animals of the United States Marine Corps
Films set in 2005
Films set in 2006
Films directed by Gabriela Cowperthwaite
Films scored by Mark Isham
2017 directorial debut films
2017 drama films
Films about veterans
2010s English-language films
2010s American films